John Wold may refer to:

 John S. Wold (1916–2017), American business executive and politician from Wyoming
 John Johnsen Wold (1795–1889), Norwegian politician